There are several rapid transit systems in France. Lille, Lyon, Marseille, Paris, Rennes and Toulouse all have metro systems. Twenty-seven French cities have light rail and tram systems.

Metros

Trams and light rail

 
Trams in France go back to 1837 when a 15 km (9.32 mi) steamtram line connected Montrond-les-Bains and Montbrison in the Loire. With the development of electric trams at the end of the 19th century, networks proliferated in French cities over a period of 15 years. Although nearly all of the country's tram systems were replaced by bus services in the 1930s or shortly after World War II, France is now in the forefront of the revival of tramways and light rail systems around the globe. Only trams lines in Lille and Saint-Étienne have operated continuously since the 19th century. Since the opening of the Nantes tramway in 1985, more than twenty towns and cities across France have built new tram lines. As of 2013, there are 25 operational tram networks in France, with 3 under construction and 4 more planned. France is also home to Alstom, a leading tram manufacturer.

List of trams and light rail systems

Notes

References